Clyde Francis Bel Jr. (June 11, 1932 – September 6, 2014) was an American politician. He served as a Democratic member for the 28th and 90th district of the Louisiana House of Representatives.

Bel was born in New Orleans, Louisiana, the son of Carmelita Killelea and Clyde F. Bel Sr., a politician. He attended the Jesuit High School, graduating in 1951. He then attended Louisiana State University. In 1968, Bel was elected for the 28th district of the Louisiana House of Representatives. He was succeeded by Thomas A. Casey in 1972. In 1976, Bel was elected for the 90th district, succeeded Casey and being succeeded by Mary Landrieu in 1980.

He died in September 2014, at the age of 82.

References 

1932 births
2014 deaths
Democratic Party members of the Louisiana House of Representatives
20th-century American politicians
Jesuit High School (New Orleans) alumni
Louisiana State University alumni